The Deputy Chief of Chaplains of the United States Air Force is the second senior-most chaplain in the United States Air Force Chaplain Corps, holding the rank of brigadier general, and acting as principal deputy to the Chief of Chaplains of the United States Air Force.

Air Force Chaplains
Official Air Force instructions task chaplains with providing "spiritual care and the opportunity for Airmen, their families, and other authorized personnel to exercise their constitutional right to the free exercise of religion."  This goal is accomplished through "religious observances, providing pastoral care, and advising leadership on spiritual, ethical, moral, morale, core values," in addition to additional religious accommodation issues that have already been identified or might arise in the future.

Additionally, "Chaplain Corps personnel conduct needs assessment based upon the commander’s mission requirements in order to plan and execute religious programs."

Armed Forces Chaplains Board

As the active duty Deputy Chief of Chaplains for the Air Force, the man or woman holding this position is one of the six chaplains (Chiefs of Chaplains and active duty Deputy Chiefs of Chaplains of the Army, Navy, and Air Force) who together comprise the Armed Forces Chaplains Board, advising the Secretary of Defense and Under Secretary of Defense for Personnel and Readiness on matters affecting military personnel throughout the U.S. military services.

U.S. Air Force Deputy Chiefs of Chaplains

See also
Armed Forces Chaplains Board
Chiefs of Chaplains of the United States
Chief of Chaplains of the United States Air Force
Military chaplain
Chaplain

References

United States Air Force Deputy
 

United States Air Force appointments